The Great Central Railway Class 1A, classified B8 by the LNER, was a class of 4-6-0 mixed-traffic locomotives designed by John G. Robinson for fast goods, relief passenger and excursion services.  They were known as the ‘Glenalmond Class’ and were a smaller wheeled version of Robinson's earlier Sir Sam Fay express passenger class (LNER Class B2), which they closely resembled.

History

GCR locomotives
The prototype was built at Gorton Locomotive Works, during 1913 and the remaining ten, one year later. They had the same design problems associated with the Sir Sam Fay class and were mainly used on secondary passenger and freight services.

Numbering

Preservation
None have been preserved.

References

01A
4-6-0 locomotives
2′C h2 locomotives
Railway locomotives introduced in 1913
Scrapped locomotives
Standard gauge steam locomotives of Great Britain
 Great Central Railway 4-6-0s